is a Japanese singer, actress, former model and a former member of idol group AKB48. She was fired after it was revealed that she broke the "boyfriends prohibited" policy of her management agency. She was a member of Team B and had returned to AKB48 as one of the seventh generation AKB48 Research Students, later Team K and finally Team A.

Profile 
Height:  (2013)
Agency:

Discography

Singles

Albums

Stage

Filmography

TV dramas

Variety

Anime television

Films

Stage

Radio

Advertisements

Video games

Music videos

Bibliography

Magazine

Calendars

References

External links
 (8 July 2013 – 21 December 2014) 

Japanese idols
Japanese women singers
Japanese female models
Japanese voice actresses
Singers from Tokyo
1993 births
Living people
AKB48 members